Lingwood railway station is on the Wherry Lines in the east of England, serving the village of Lingwood, Norfolk. Its three-letter station code is LGD.

It is managed by Greater Anglia, which operates all trains serving the station.

The station dates back to 1882, when it was built by the Great Eastern Railway to serve the village of Lingwood. At this time agriculture was thriving in the village and surrounding areas, so much so that over £1,000 was spent on a large warehouse next to the station. This was served by sidings, a second platform and a goods yard. Much of this still exists to this day although is not publicly accessible.

The station building fell out of use 1965 during the Beeching cuts. After this it was used as a dress shop, and then a doctor's surgery, before being left derelict for several years in the early 1980s. It was then bought from British Rail in 1989 by the current owners, and was completely renovated. Many of the original features were retained, and it was opened as a Bed & Breakfast in 1990, which it remains.

Services
 the typical Monday-Saturday off-peak service at Lingwood is as follows:

References
 Ordnance Survey (2005). OS Explorer Map OL40 - The Broads. .

External links 

Railway stations in Norfolk
DfT Category F2 stations
Former Great Eastern Railway stations
Greater Anglia franchise railway stations
Railway stations in Great Britain opened in 1882